The 2021 Women's World Draughts Championship at the international draughts took place from June 28 to July 14, 2021, in Tallinn, Estonia, under the auspices International Draughts Federation FMJD. 16 players from 9 countries competing in the tournament, which played in COVID bubble Hotel Viru. Championship played round-robin. Main referee IR Frank Teer (The Netherlands). The winning prize for the tournament 20,000 euros.

At the same hotel simultaneously took place 2021 World Draughts Championship.

Matrena Nogovitsyna from Russia won first title.

Rules and regulations
The games were played in the official FMJD time rate of the Fischer system with 1 hour and 20 minutes for the game plus 1 minute per move. Conforming to the FMJD regulations players are not allowed to agree on a draw before they both made 40 moves. If they do so nevertheless, the referee is obliged to decide on a 0-point each players.

The final classification was based on the total points obtained. If two or more players share the same place, the following factors will be used to define the places occupied:

1. the largest number of victories

2. the best results between this players

3. the best results obtained in order of the classification.

For the places 1—3 will be played tie-break with Lehmann-Georgiev system (15 minutes and 2 seconds added per move for an unlimited number of games).

Other places will be shared.

Schedule

Participants

Results

References

External links
Offiсial site
Participants
Global reserve list for WC2021
World Championship 2021 Women
Worldchampionship Women Tallinn 2021, KNDB

Draughts world championships
2021 in draughts
2021 in Estonian sport
Sport in Tallinn
International sports competitions hosted by Estonia
Draughts World Championship
Draughts World Championship